Kenneth Joseph Rankin (February 10, 1940 – June 7, 2009) was an American singer and songwriter in the folk rock and singer-songwriter genres; he was influenced by jazz. Rankin would often sing notes in a high range to express emotion.

Biography
Rankin was from the Washington Heights neighborhood of New York City. He was raised and introduced to music by his mother, who sang at home and for friends. Early in his career he worked as a singer-songwriter.

Three of Rankin's albums entered the Billboard magazine Album Chart. Most of his career was in pop music.

He was a guitarist on the album Bringing It All Back Home by Bob Dylan. He appeared on The Tonight Show more than twenty times. Late night TV host Johnny Carson wrote the liner notes to Rankin's 1967 debut album, Mind Dusters, which included the single "Peaceful." Georgie Fame had had a UK hit with the song in 1969. This was Rankin's only songwriting credit to make the British charts, reaching No. 16 and spending nine weeks on the chart. Rankin re-recorded the song  for his album Like a Seed (1972). Helen Reddy covered "Peaceful" in 1973; it reached No. 2 on the US Adult Contemporary chart and No. 12 on the pop charts in both the US and Canada.

When Rankin worked with Alan Broadbent, Mike Wofford, and Bill Watrous, his music got closer to jazz. His songs were performed by Peggy Lee, Mel Tormé and Carmen McRae; Stan Getz said his voice was like "a horn with a heartbeat". Reflecting his interest in Brazilian music Rankin recorded the album  Here in My Heart in Rio de Janeiro with jazz musicians Michael Brecker and Ernie Watts. He returned to more contemporary songs after signing with Verve Records, including "A Song for You" by Leon Russell and "I've Just Seen a Face" by the Beatles. After recording the Beatles' song "Blackbird" for his album Silver Morning, he was asked by Paul McCartney to perform it when McCartney and John Lennon were inducted into the Songwriters Hall of Fame.

Rankin befriended comedian George Carlin; both were signed to Little David Records. Starting in 1972 Rankin was often the opening act or musical guest for Carlin's live performances. The two flew in Carlin's private jet. Although Rankin had overcome his drug habit at Phoenix House, he returned to using cocaine while on tour with Carlin. Rankin and Carlin toured together intermittently for nearly ten years. Rankin sang at Carlin's memorial service in June 2008.

Personal life and death 
He was married to Yvonne Rodriguez-Calderone and is survived by son Chris Rankin, daughters Chanda Rankin and Jena Rankin-Ray and a granddaughter.

Rankin died of lung cancer on June 7, 2009, three weeks after he was diagnosed with the illness.

Selected discography

Albums

 Mind-Dusters (Mercury, 1967)
 Family (Mercury, 1969)
 Like a Seed (Little David, 1972)
 Silver Morning (Little David, 1974)
 Inside (Little David, 1975)
 The Kenny Rankin Album (Little David, 1977)
 After the Roses (Atlantic, 1980)
 Hiding in Myself (Cypress, 1988)
 Because of You (Chesky, 1991)
 Professional Dreamer (Private Music, 1995)
 Here in My Heart (Private Music, 1997)
 The Bottom Line Encore Collection (The Bottom Line, 1999)
 A Christmas Album (Rankin Music, 1999)
 Haven't We Met? (Image Entertainment, 2001)
 A Song for You (Verve, 2002)

As guest
With Benny Carter
 Benny Carter Songbook (MusicMasters, 1996)
 Benny Carter Songbook Volume II (MusicMasters, 1997)
 Art Garfunkel album Lefty, duet on "I Wonder Why" 1988

References

External links
Official website

LA Times obituary
Kenny Rankin on album cover with his daughters
Early and past music covers

1940 births
2009 deaths
20th-century American male musicians
20th-century American singers
American jazz singers
American jazz songwriters
American male songwriters
Chesky Records artists
Deaths from lung cancer in California
Jazz musicians from New York (state)
American male jazz musicians
People from Washington Heights, Manhattan
Private Music artists
Singers from New York City
Songwriters from New York (state)